A Member of Tattersall's is a 1919 British silent sports film directed by Albert Ward and starring Isobel Elsom, Malcolm Cherry and Campbell Gullan. It was based on a play by H.V. Browning.

Cast
 Isobel Elsom - Mary Wilmott
 Malcolm Cherry - Captain Brookes Greville
 Campbell Gullan - Foxey
 Tom Reynolds - Peter Perks
 James Lindsay - Lord Winthrop

References

External links

1919 films
1910s sports films
British sports drama films
British silent feature films
Films directed by Albert Ward
British films based on plays
British black-and-white films
1910s English-language films
1910s British films
Silent drama films
Silent sports films